William Thomas Tyndall (January 16, 1862 – November 26, 1928) was a U.S. Representative from Missouri's 14th congressional district.

Born in Sparta, Missouri, Tyndall attended the public schools, Henderson Academy at Sparta, and Sparta Academy.
He engaged in teaching at Sparta in 1884–1895.
He studied law.
He was admitted to the bar in 1893 and commenced practice in Sparta.
He was appointed postmaster of Sparta, Missouri, by President Harrison and served from March 23, 1891, to November 14, 1893.
He was again appointed postmaster by President McKinley, and served from December 8, 1897, to January 7, 1905.

Tyndall was elected as a Republican to the Fifty-ninth Congress (March 4, 1905 – March 3, 1907).
He was an unsuccessful candidate for reelection in 1906 to the Sixtieth Congress.
He resumed the practice of law in Sparta, Missouri.
He moved to Bartlesville, Oklahoma, in 1912 and continued the practice of law until his death there November 26, 1928.
He was interred in a mausoleum in White Rose Cemetery.

References

1862 births
1928 deaths
20th-century American lawyers
Republican Party members of the United States House of Representatives from Missouri
Missouri postmasters
Schoolteachers from Missouri
19th-century American educators
20th-century American politicians
Missouri lawyers
19th-century American lawyers